Al Posto del Mondo is the fourth album by Italian jazz vocalist Chiara Civello and the first that she has produced.

Track listing

See also
La Llave de Mi Corazón - Juan Luis Guerra

References

External links
 Official site

2012 albums
Chiara Civello albums